Capital Shoppers Limited, commonly known as Capital Shoppers, is a Ugandan supermarket chain.

Location
The Head Office of Capital Shoppers is located along Plot 2 Dastur Street, Kampala Central Division, in the city's central business district, adjacent to Nakasero Farmers' Market. The coordinates of Capital Shoppers Headquarters are:0°18'40.5"N, 32°34'45.0"E (Latitude:0.311250; Longitude:32.579167).

Overview
The supermarket chain owns and operates four supermarkets in Uganda; all located in Kampala, the capital of Uganda, the third-largest economy in the East African Community. Capital Shoppers is the largest locally owned supermarket chain in the country. Founded in 1997, the family-owned store chain has a customer-royalty program that offers 4% rebate on purchases, the highest in the industry in Uganda.

Branches
 the supermarket chain maintains branches at the following locations: (a) Central Kampala: Dastur Street, Nakasero Hill, Kampala (b) Nakawa Branch: Port Bell Road, Nakawa, Kampala
(c) Ntinda Branch: Capital Shoppers Mall, Ntinda Road, Ntinda, Kampala and (d) Garden City Branch: Garden City Mall, Kampala.

Ownership
Capital Shoppers is a wholly Ugandan, privately held company. , Ugandan media reports indicated that the supermarket chain is owned by  Mr. and Mrs. Ngabirano.

See also

References

External links
 Supermarkets Kicking Local Bakeries Out of Business

Supermarkets of Uganda
Retail companies established in 1997
1997 establishments in Uganda
Companies based in Kampala